Lokveni is a village in the municipality of Dolneni, North Macedonia. It used to be part of the former municipality of Žitoše.

Demographics
According to the 2021 census, the village had a total of 144 inhabitants. Ethnic groups in the village include:

Macedonians 11
Albanians
Turks 3
Bosniaks 115
Others 11

References

Villages in Dolneni Municipality